Matamoras is an unincorporated community in the northeast portion of Harrison Township, Blackford County, in the U.S. state of Indiana.  Matamoras is Blackford County's oldest community, although it was not the first to be platted.

Geography
Matamoras is located on the Salamonie River, less than one mile east of Montpelier.

History
It was likely named after Matamoros, Mexico, a battleground in the Mexican–American War.

Notes

References

Unincorporated communities in Blackford County, Indiana
Unincorporated communities in Indiana